The surface of the planet Mercury has been divided into fifteen quadrangles, designated H-1 to H-15 (the 'H' stands for Hermes, the Greek equivalent of Mercury). The quadrangles are named for prominent surface features visible within each area. The quadrangles were initially named for albedo features, as these were the most prominent features visible before mapping was carried out by spacecraft. The mapping carried out with the images obtained by the Mariner 10 flybys in 1974 and 1975 led to nine of the quadrangles being renamed for newly mapped prominent features. The remaining six quadrangles were completely unmapped by Mariner 10 and were still referred to by their albedo feature names. Following the arrival of MESSENGER in orbit in 2011, these six quadrangles were mapped and renamed.  The base mosaic used in the new maps was produced with orbital images by the MESSENGER Team and released by NASA’s Planetary Data System on March 8, 2013. This global mosaic includes 100% coverage of Mercury’s surface.

Schema of the quadrangles 
Relationship of the quadrangles to each other on the surface of Mercury (North is at the top):

See also 
 List of quadrangles on Venus
 List of quadrangles on the Moon
 List of quadrangles on Mars

References 

Mercury (planet)-related lists